Lindokuhle is a South African given name. Notable people with the name include: 

 Lindokuhle Mbatha (born 1985), South African football player
 Lindokuhle Mnguni (born 1994), South African activist, assassinated in 2022
 Lindokuhle Mkhwanazi (born 1985), South African football player
 Lindokuhle Sibankulu (born 1981), South African basketball player 
 Lindokuhle Welemu (born 1991), South African rugby player, sport coach and ambassador

See also
 Linda (name)
 Lindo, a surname